Maaike Caelers (born 2 September 1990) is a Dutch triathlete. She competed in the Women's event at the 2012 Summer Olympics. In 2013, she was part of ECS Triathlon club. The table shows the most significant results (podium) achieved on the national and international triathlon circuit since 2010.

References

External links 
 
 

1990 births
Living people
Dutch female triathletes
Olympic triathletes of the Netherlands
Triathletes at the 2012 Summer Olympics
European Games competitors for the Netherlands
Triathletes at the 2015 European Games
Sportspeople from Weert
20th-century Dutch women
21st-century Dutch women